Khudrizi or Khudrizai is a small village located in Pakistan on GT Road on the way from Nowshehra to Peshawar. Khudrizi is part of Pabbi2 union council.

Village
The village has a 75% literacy rate. There is a degree college in Khudrizi (the Government Degree College Pabbi). There is also a police station in Khudrizi under Pabbi police station, which in turn is under the circle of the Nowshera District superintendent police officer. There is one government high school for boys and one for girls (which is already shared with all of the nearby villages and quite congested). Different private schools are also operational. Cina public school (under the administrator Ghulam Nabi (Khudrizwal)) is very popular.

The people of Khudrizi village are known as khudrezwaaland the cast of khudrizwal is (kakakheil_Azamkheil_Durrani etc). Almost all the population migrated from different Pukhtoon areas in the 18th century. 
Basucally, Khudriziwal migrated from village Masho Gagar, in Bara Momand area on Indus High Way. The Khans of Masho Gagar have ancestral property in Ghari Jabbar Khan Pabbi. The Government College Pabbi and The Girls School Dag besoud is located in this property. Which they donated to Education Department free of cost.

Populated places in Nowshera District